The Nanpan River has its source in the Yungui Plateau of eastern Yunnan Province. It then flows east, forming part of the border between Guizhou and Guangxi provinces. It joins with the Beipan River to become the Hongshui River.

Part of the Nanpan River is blocked by the Tianshengqiao Dam, from which Wanfeng Lake is formed.

Along the Nanpan river, many ports were owned by the Cen clan who established in Guangxi to suppress a rebellion since 1053 AD.

References

Rivers of Yunnan
Rivers of Guizhou
Rivers of Guangxi
Tributaries of the Pearl River (China)